Kefalonia or Cephalonia, formerly also known as Kefallinia or Kephallenia, is the largest of the Ionian Islands in western Greece and the 6th largest island in Greece after Crete, Euboea, Lesbos, Rhodes and Chios. It is also a separate regional unit of the Ionian Islands region. It was a former Latin Catholic diocese Kefalonia–Zakynthos (Cefalonia–Zante) and short-lived titular see as just Kefalonia. The capital city of Cephalonia is Argostoli.

History

Antiquity

Legend

An aition explaining the name of Cephallenia and reinforcing its cultural connections with Athens associates the island with the mythological figure of Cephalus, who helped Amphitryon of Mycenae in a war against the Taphians and Teleboans.  He was rewarded with the island of Same, which thereafter came to be known as Cephallenia.

Kefalonia has also been suggested as the Homeric Ithaca, the home of Odysseus, rather than the smaller island bearing this name today. Robert Bittlestone, in his book Odysseus Unbound, has suggested that Paliki, now a peninsula of Cephalonia, was a separate island during the late Bronze Age, and it may be this which Homer was referring to when he described Ithaca. A project which started in the summer of 2007 and lasted three years has examined this possibility.

Kefalonia is also referenced in relation to the goddess Britomartis, as the location where she is said to have 'received divine honours from the inhabitants under the name of Laphria'.

Middle Ages

In the late Roman Empire, Cephalonia was part of the Roman province of Achaea. Ecclesiastically it was a suffragan of the Metropolis of Nicopolis (the eparchy of Epirus I). The four ancient cities of the island survived into late antiquity, with Sami probably as the island's capital.

Following the loss of the bulk of Italy, and the expansion of the Muslims into the Western Mediterranean, the island became a strategically important base of operations for the Byzantine Empire in the area, blocking Muslim raids into the Adriatic and serving as a bridge for expeditions in Italy. Already from the 8th century, it was the centre of the namesake theme of Cephallenia. At the same time, the capital was moved to the Castle of Saint George, a more well-protected site in the island's interior. Mardaites were resettled in Cephalonia to serve as marines, and political prisoners were sometimes exiled there.

The loss of Byzantine Italy in 1071 diminished Cephalonia's importance, and its administration passed from a military strategos to a civilian judge (krites). Its main city was besieged by the Italo-Normans in 1085, and the Venetians plundered the island in 1126. Cephalonia was captured during the Third Norman invasion of the Balkans in 1185, and it became part of the County palatine of Cephalonia and Zakynthos under the Kingdom of Sicily and Venetian suzerainty, until its last Count Leonardo III Tocco was defeated and the island conquered by the Ottoman Empire in 1479.

Venetian rule

Turkish rule lasted only until 1500, when Cephalonia was captured by a Spanish-Venetian army, a rare Venetian success in the Second Ottoman–Venetian War. From then on Cephalonia and Ithaca remained part of the Stato da Mar of the Venetian Republic until its very end, following the fate of the Ionian islands, completed by the capture of Lefkas from the Turks in 1684. The Treaty of Campoformio dismantling the Venetian Republic awarded the Ionian Islands to France, a French expeditionary force with boats captured in Venice taking control of the islands in June 1797.

Because of the liberal situation on the island, the Venetian governor Marc'Antonio Giustiniani (1516–1571) printed Hebrew books and exported them to the whole eastern Mediterranean. In 1596 the Venetians built the Assos Castle, one of Cephalonia's main tourist attractions today. From the 16th to the 18th centuries, the island was one of the largest exporters of currants in the world with Zakynthos, and owned a large shipping fleet, even commissioning ships from the Danzig shipyard. Its towns and villages were mostly built high on hilltops, to prevent attacks from raiding parties of pirates that sailed the Ionian Sea during the 1820s.

French, Ionian state period and British rule

Venice was conquered by France in 1797 and Cephalonia, along with the other Ionian Islands, became part of the French département of Ithaque.

In the following year, 1798, the French were forced to yield the Ionian Islands to a combined Russian and Turkish fleet. From 1799 to 1807, Cephalonia was part of the Septinsular Republic, nominally under the sovereignty of the Ottoman Empire, but protected by Russia.

By the Tilsit Treaty in 1807, the Ionian Islands were ceded back to France, which remained in control until 1809.

In 1809, the British established a blockade on the Ionian Islands as part of their conflict with France, and in September of that year they hoisted the Union Flag above the castle of Zakynthos. Cephalonia and Ithaca soon surrendered, and the British installed provisional governments. The treaty of Paris in 1815 recognised the United States of the Ionian Islands and decreed that it become a British protectorate. Colonel Charles Philippe de Bosset became provisional governor between 1810 and 1814. During this period he was credited with achieving many public works, including the Drapano Bridge.

A few years later Greek nationalist groups started to form. Although their energy in the early years was directed to supporting the Greeks in the revolution against the Ottoman Empire, it soon started to turn towards the British. By 1848, calls for enosis with Greece were gaining strength and there were rebellions against British rule in Argostoli and Lixouri, which led to some relaxation in the laws and to freedom of the press. Union with Greece was now a declared aim, and by 1849, a growing restlessness resulted in another rebellion against the British, which was suppressed by the island's governor, Sir Henry George Ward.

Cephalonia, along with the other islands, were transferred to Greece in 1864 as a gesture of goodwill when the British-supported Prince William of Denmark became King George the First of the Hellenes.

Union with Greece
In 1864, Cephalonia, together with all the other Ionian Islands, became a full member of the Greek state.

World War II

In World War II, the island was occupied by Axis forces. Until late 1943, the occupying force was predominantly Italian, the 33rd Infantry Division Acqui plus Navy personnel totalled 12,000 men, but about 2,000 troops from Germany  were also present. The island was largely spared the fighting, until the armistice with Italy concluded by the Allies in September 1943. Confusion followed on the island, as the Italians were hoping to return home, but German forces did not want the Italians' munitions to be used eventually against them; Italian forces were hesitant to turn over weapons for the same reason. As German reinforcements headed to the island the Italians dug in and, eventually, after a referendum among the soldiers as to surrender or battle, they fought against the new German invasion. The fighting came to a head at the siege of Argostoli, where the Italians held out. Ultimately the Germans prevailed, taking full control of the island.

Approximately five thousand of the nine thousand surviving Italian soldiers were executed in reprisal by the German forces. The book Captain Corelli's Mandolin by Louis de Bernières, which was later made into  a film, is based on this event. While the war ended in central Europe in 1945, Cephalonia remained in a state of conflict due to the Greek Civil War. Peace returned to Greece and the island in 1949.

Earthquake of 1953

Cephalonia lies just to the southeast of a major active fault zone, where the Eurasian Plate meets the Aegean Plate at a transform boundary. The island itself is affected by a series of active thrust faults, which are responsible for the continuing uplift.

A series of four earthquakes hit the island in August 1953, and caused major destruction, with virtually every house on the island destroyed. The third and most destructive of the quakes took place on 12 August 1953 at 09:24 UTC (11:24 local time), with a magnitude of 6.8 on the Moment magnitude scale. Its epicentre was directly south of the southern tip of Cephalonia, and caused the entire island to be raised  higher, where it remains, with evidence in water marks on rocks around the coastline.

The 1953 Ionian earthquake disaster caused huge destruction, with only regions in the north escaping the heaviest tremors and houses there remaining intact. Damage was estimated to run into tens of millions of dollars, equivalent to billions of drachmas, but the real damage to the economy occurred when residents left the island. The majority of the population left the island soon after, seeking a new life elsewhere.

Recent history

The forest fire scar was visible for some years.

In mid-November 2003, an earthquake measuring 5.3 on the Richter magnitude scale caused minor damage to business, residential property, and other buildings in and near Argostoli. Damages were around €1,000,000.

On the morning of 20 September 2005, an early-morning earthquake shook the south-western part of the island, especially near Lixouri and nearby villages. The earthquake measured 4.9 on the Richter magnitude scale, and its epicentre was located off the island at sea. Service vehicles took care of the area, and no damage was reported. From 24 to 26 January 2006, a major snowstorm blanketed the entire island, causing extensive blackouts. The island was recently struck yet again by another forest fire in the south of the island, beginning of 18 July 2007 during an unusual heatwave, and spreading slowly. Firefighters along with helicopters and planes battled the blaze for some days and the spectacle frightened residents on that area of the island.

In 2011 the eight former municipalities of the island lost their independence to form one united municipality. After losing its role as the capital of the island in the 19th century, Lixouri lost also its role as a seat of a municipality after 500 years. The Technological Educational Institute of the Ionian Islands closed one faculty in Lixouri and one in Argostoli.

In January 2014, an earthquake measuring 5.9 on the Richter magnitude scale left at least seven injured. There are reports of minor injuries and some damage to property," said the Foreign Office, on its website. "The airport remains operational but there may be some disruption to port services."

Archaeology

In the southwestern portion of the island, in the area of Leivatho, an ongoing archaeological field survey by the Irish Institute at Athens has discovered dozens of sites with dates ranging from the Palaeolithic to the Venetian period.

Cephalonia is extremely interesting archaeologically; finds go back to 40,000 BP. Without doubt, the most important era for the island is the Mycenaean era, from approximately 1500BC to 1100 BC. The archaeological museum in Cephalonia's capital, although small, is of great importance due to its exhibits from this era.

The most important archaeological discovery in Cephalonia (and indeed in Greece) of recent decades is that, in 1991, of the Mycenaean Tholos tomb at the outskirts of Tzanata, near Poros in southeastern Cephalonia (former Municipality of Elios-Pronni) in a setting of olive trees, cypresses and oaks. The tomb was erected around 1300 BC; kings and highly ranked officials were buried in such tombs during the Mycenaean period. It is the largest tholos tomb yet found in northwestern Greece, and was excavated by archaeologist Lazaros Kolonas. The size of the tomb, the nature of the burial offerings found there, and its well-chosen position point to the existence of an important Mycenaean town in the vicinity.

In late 2006, a Roman grave complex was uncovered as the foundation of a new hotel was being excavated in Fiskardo. The remains date to the period between the 2nd century BC and the 4th century AD. Archaeologists described it as the most important find of its kind in the Ionian Islands. Inside the complex, five burial sites were found, including a large vaulted tomb and a stone coffin, along with gold earrings and rings, gold leaves that may have been attached to ceremonial clothing, glass and ceramic pots, bronze artefacts decorated with masks, a bronze lock and bronze coins. The tomb had escaped the attention of grave robbers and remained undisturbed for thousands of years. When the tomb was opened the stone door easily swung on its stone hinges. A Roman theatre was discovered very near the tomb, so well preserved that the metal joints between the seats were still intact.

A dissertation published in 1987 claims that Saint Paul, on his way from Palestine to Rome in AD 59, was shipwrecked and confined for three months not on Malta but on Cephalonia.

According to Clement of Alexandria, the island had the largest community of Carpocratians, an early Gnostic Christian sect, because Carpocrates lived on the island.

Population: historical evolution
In the ancient period, the people lived in four cities on the island. Krani, Sami(or Samos), Pale and Pronnoi(Proni) formed a federation called "tetrapolis".

In more recent times the population reached 70,000, in 1896, but declined gradually in the 20th century. The great 1953 Ionian earthquake forced many people to leave the island.<ref name="cambridge">[http://assets.cambridge.org/052185/3575/excerpt/0521853575_excerpt.pdf Odysseus Unbound: The Search for Homer's Ithaca – excerpt]. Robert Bittlestone, Cambridge University Press, 2005. Page relating the account of a local to the 1953 great earthquake.</ref> Many of those who left moved to Patras or Athens, or emigrated to America and Australia, following relatives who had left the island decades before. In the same period people from poorer areas of Greece such as Epirus and Thrace came to the island. The population has hovered between 35,000 and 42,000 since then; in the 2011 census, it was 35,801.

Most of the indigenous people of Cephalonia have surnames ending in "-atos", such as the Alexatos (Greek: Αλεξάτος) families, and almost every settlement on the island has a name ending in "-ata", such as Metaxata, Chavriata, Frangata, Lourdata, Favata, Delaportata and others.

 Ecclesiastical history 

In 1222 the Frankish Crusaders established the Diocese of Kefalonia–Zakynthos (Cefalonia–Zante in Curiate Italian), which survived their rule and even the Turks. In 1919, the residential see was suppressed but immediately transformed into a titular bishopric of Kefalonia (Cefalonia in Italian). The territory and title were merged into the Metropolitan Archdiocese of Corfu–Zakynthos–Kefalonia. In 1921, this was also suppressed, never having had an incumbent.

 Geography 

The main island of the regional unit is Cephalonia and has a size of 773 km2 (300 mi2), with a population density of 55 people per km2 (140/mi2). The town of Argostoli has one-third of the island's inhabitants. Lixouri is the second major settlement, and the two towns together account for almost two-thirds of the prefecture's population.

The other major islands are: Petalas Island and Asteris Island, but they are uninhabited.

Cephalonia lies in the heart of an earthquake zone, and dozens of minor, unrecorded tremors occur each year. In 1953, a massive earthquake destroyed almost all of the settlements on the island, leaving only Fiskardo in the north untouched.

Important natural features include Melissani Lake, the Drogarati caves, and the Koutavos Lagoon in Argostoli.

The island has a rich biodiversity, with a substantial number of endemic and rare species. Some areas have been declared a site in the European Union's Natura 2000 network.

 Mountains 
The island's highest mountain is Mount Ainos, with an elevation of 1628 meters; to the west-northwest are the Paliki mountains, where Lixouri is found, with other mountains including Geraneia (Gerania) and Agia Dynati. The top of Mount Ainos is covered with fir trees and is a natural park.

Forestry is rare on the island; however its timber output is one of the highest in the Ionian islands, although lower than that of Elia in the Peloponnese. Forest fires were common during the 1990s and the early 2000s, and still pose a major threat to the population.

 Capes 
Cape Agios Georgios: approximate coordinates 
Cape Kounopetra
Cape Atheras: north-western corner of island

 Flora 
Most of the Ainos mountain range is designated as a National Park and is covered with the unique species of Greek fir (Abies Cephalonica) and black pine (Pinus nigra).

 Fauna 
Cephalonia is well known for its endangered loggerhead turtle population, also known as the Caretta caretta turtle, which nests on many of the beaches along the south coast of the island. The turtles can also be seen in the waters of Argostoli harbour, in Koutavos Lagoon, while walking on De Bosset Bridge. A small population of the endangered Mediterranean monk seal, Monachus monachus, also lives around the island's coast, especially on parts of the coast which are inaccessible to humans due to the terrain. Caves on these parts of the coast offer ideal locations for the seals to give birth to their pups and nurse them through the first months of their lives. The most famous breeding ground in Cephalonia is a cave on Foki beach, located on the north-east coast near Fiskardo.

The European pine marten also inhabits the island.

Over 200 species of birds have been spotted on the island.

 Climate 

Cephalonia has hot, sunny summers and mild rainy winters. During winter it can occasionally snow on the mountain peaks of the island's mountain ranges. The winter months can experience up to 156 mm of rainfall, resulting in high levels of humidity on the island. Winter temperature on Kefalonia average at 14-15 C during the day and fall at night to an average of 8-9 C.  During the summer months there is usually little to no rainfall.  Rain in the summer can usually be seen, but the dry air prevents it from being felt as it is evaporated before it reaches the ground.

 Economy 

Wine and raisins are the oldest products exported, being important until the 20th century. Today fish farming and calcium carbonate are most important.

Most Greek ship-owner families have their origin in the islands of Andros, Chios or Cephalonia.

 Agriculture 
The primary agricultural occupations are animal breeding and olive growing, with the remainder largely composed of grain and vegetables. Most vegetable production takes place on the plains, which cover less than 15% of the island, most of which is rugged and mountainous, suitable only for goats. Less than a quarter of the island's land is arable.

Until the 1970s, most Cephalonians lived in rural areas, while today, two-thirds of the population lives in urban areas, with the other third in rural towns and villages close to farmland.

The island has a long winemaking tradition and is home to the dry, white lemony wines made from the Robola grape.

 Olive oil production 
Olive oil production is a major component of Cephalonia's economy. Until the 18th century, the quantity of olive oil produced on the island just covered the needs of the residents. However, the pressure of Venetian conquerors' for olive plantation, especially after the loss of Peloponnese and Crete, resulted in increasing the production to such a degree that the first exports to Venice began. Before the 1953 Ionian earthquake, there were 200 oil presses operating on the island; today, there are thirteen. There are over one million olive trees on Cephalonia, covering almost 55% of the island's area. Olive oil is very important to the island's local, agricultural economy. "Koroneiki" and "theiako" are the two main varieties cultivated on the island, followed by a smaller number of "ntopia" and "matolia". Kefalonian olive oil has a green tone, a rich, greasy touch, and low acidity.

 Tourism 
Tourism to Cephalonia started in the early 19th century. The royal family of Greece sent their children in the summer Lixouri, in the early 20th century, but the island was not discovered by most tourists until the 1980s. Cephalonia is a popular holiday destination for many Italians, due to its proximity to Italy.

Two cultural attractions, the fishing villages of Fiscardo and Assos, and other natural attractions, including Melissani underground lake, Drogarati cave and Myrtos beach, have helped popularize Cephalonia. The film Captain Corelli's Mandolin (film) (2001), filmed on the island, made Cephalonia more widely known.

Listed in The Daily Telegraph as one of the 20 Mediterranean islands you must visit in your lifetime.

 Culture 

 Monasteries and churches 

Across the broader island, two large monasteries are to be found: the first is that of Haghia Panagia in Markopoulo to the southeast, and the other lies on the road between Argostoli and Michata, on a small plain surrounded by mountains. This second has an avenue of about 200 trees aligned from NW to SE, with a circle in the middle, and is the monastery of Saint Gerasimus of Kefalonia, patron saint of the island, whose relics can be seen and venerated at the old church of the monastery. The monastery of "Sissia" was probably founded by Francis of Assisi, it was destroyed in 1953 but the ruins still exist. Although much of the island was destroyed by earthquakes, many notable churches all over the island have survived, some dating back to the renaissance. The ornaments of the churches are influenced by Venetian manierism.

 Music 

The Ionian Islands have a musical tradition called the Ionian School. Lixouri has the Philharmonic Orchestra (since 1836) and Argostoli the Rokos Vergottis Conservatory. Richard Strauss visited Lixouri some times where he had an affair with the pianist Dora Wihan (born Weiss).

The Ionian Islands also developed a distinctive culture primarily as they did not experience Ottoman occupation, instead having ties to Venice, and musically drew from Italian influences, and Western Harmonics. This evolved into a unique musical style among the Greeks, the Cantada (Serenade) very similar to the Latin/Spanish/Italian Cantar (to sing). The Cantadas are an example of the Ionian music. Cantadas are still very popular and can be heard even today.

 Literature and film 
The novelists Nikos Kavvadias (1910–1975) and the Swiss  (1917–2010) spent parts of their life on the island. Andreas Laskaratos was a satirical poet and wrote about the society in the town of Lixouri. Lord Byron wrote parts of "Prelude" and "Don Juan" in Livatho.

Additionally, a theory was proposed by Greek researcher Libieris Liberatos as to the true identity of the island setting from Shakespeare's "The Tempest" being Cephallonia.  

Perhaps the best known appearance of Cephalonia in popular culture is in the novel Captain Corelli's Mandolin, by the English author Louis de Bernières. The book is believed to have been inspired by the village of Farsa, just outside Argostoli. The love story comprising the theme of the book is set before and after the Acqui Division massacre, during the Second World War. A film adaptation was released in 2001. During filming there was lively debate between the production team, local authorities as well as groups of citizens, as to the complex historical details of the island's antifascist resistance. As a result, political references were omitted from the film, and the romantic core of the book was preserved, without entering complex debates about the island's history. In 2005, Riccardo Milani made his TV film, Cefalonia, also about the massacre, with music by Ennio Morricone.

 Museums 
 Korgialeneios Museum (under the Korgialeneios Library) in Argostoli
 Kosmetatos Foundation in Argostoli
 Archaeological Museum of Argostoli
 Iakovatios-Library (and museum) in Lixouri
 Museum in Fiskardo
 Kefalonia Natural History Museum
 Nautical Museum of Sami

 Higher education 
 Ionian University, Argostoli Campus (Department of Food Science and Technology and Department of Department of Digital Media and Communication)
 Ionian University, Lixouri Campus (Department of Ethnomusicology )
 National Merchant Marine Academy, Argostoli
 The Music School of Kefalonia – Rokos Vergotis Conservatory, Argostoli

 Sport 

 Baseball 

 AINOS Kefalonia

 Cycling 

 AINOS Kefalonia podilatikos omilos 26710-25029

 Football (soccer) 

 Other sports 
 Nautical Racing Club of Kefalonia and Ithaca
 Natura & Pet – Veterinary pharmacy

 Transportation 

 Harbours and ports 
There are five harbours and ports in the prefecture and you can get to Kefalonia by boat: four main harbours on the island, Sami, a major port with links to Patras and Ithaca; Poros, in the south, has ferry routes to Kyllini; Argostoli, in the west, is the largest port, for local boats and ferries to Zante and regularly to Lixouri; Fiscardo, in the north, has links to Lefkas and Ithaca. There is a road connection to the rest of the island, but driving from Lixouri to Argostoli involves a  detour.

 Roads 
The first larger roads were built by the British in the 19th century. In the 20th century asphalted roads were built, and since 1995 almost all streets connecting villages and beaches are covered with asphalt. Since c. 2000 the Lixouri bypass was built and a four lane street south of Argostoli was constructed.
Some important roads include:

Greek National Road 50, commonly Argostoli-Sami Road
Argostoli-Poros Road
Argostoli-Fiskardo Road (with link to Lixouri).
Road linking Poros and Sami

 Public transportation 
The ferry between Argostoli and Lixouri goes every hour and every half-hour in the season. There are a few bus lines serving the more rural areas of Kefalonia, but often only two times a day. The KTEL bus cooperation offers services from Lixouri, Poros and Argostoli to the mainland.

 Airport 
Almost every scheduled flight is an Olympic Air route, flying mainly to and from Athens, although there is an Ionian Island Hopper service three times a week calling at Cephalonia, Zante and Lefkas. In summer the airport handles a number of charter flights from all over Europe.

In December 2015 the privatisation of Kefalonia Airport and 13 other regional airports of Greece was finalised with the signing of the agreement between the Fraport AG/Copelouzos Group joint venture and the state privatisation fund. "We signed the deal today," the head of Greece's privatisation agency HRADF, Stergios Pitsiorlas, told Reuters. According to the agreement, the joint venture will operate the 14 airports (including Kefallinia International Airport) for 40 years as of autumn 2016.

 Administration 
Cephalonia is a distinct regional unit of the Ionian Islands region, and since 2019 it consists of three municipalities: Argostoli,  Lixouri and Sami. Between the 2011 Kallikratis government reform and 2019, there was one single municipality on the island: Cephalonia, created out of the 8 former municipalities on the island. At the same reform, the regional unit Cephalonia was created out of part of the former Cephalonia Prefecture. The seat of administration is Argostoli, the island's main town.

The municipality of Argostoli consists of the following municipal units (former municipalities):
 Argostoli
 Eleios-Pronnoi
 Leivatho
 Omala

The municipality of Sami consists of the following municipal units:
 Erisos
 Pylaros
 Sami

The municipality of Lixouri coincides with the former municipality Paliki.

The regional unit has an area of 786.575 km2. The Cephalonia regional unit also includes a number of uninhabited islands of the Echinades group. They are administered by the municipal unit of Pylaros. The most significant are as follows:

 Notable people and residents 

 Antiquity
 Cephalus, hero-figure in Greek mythology, Patriarch of all Kephalonians (Cephallenians)
 Odysseus of Ithaca, king of the Cephalonians
 Epiphanes was born on Cephalonia in the late 1st century or early 2nd century to Carpocrates (his father), and Alexandria of Kephallenia. He is the legendary author of On Righteousness, a notable Gnostic literary work that promotes communist principles.
 Gaius Antonius Hybrida, the uncle of the famed triumvir Mark Antony and co-consul of Cicero, who was exiled to Cephalonia in 59 BC.

 Middle Ages to 1800
 Juan de Fuca (Ioannis Phokas) (1536–1602), captain and explorer
 Constantine Phaulkon (1647–1688), adventurer, first counsellor to King Narai of Ayutthaya
 Giacomo Pylarini (1659–1718), doctor who gave the first smallpox inoculation outside of Turkey and contributed to the later development of vaccination against smallpox, by Edward Jenner.
 Ilias Miniatis (1669–1714), clergyman, writer and preacher. Born in Lixouri
 Leichoudes brothers, founders of the Slavic Greek Latin Academy in Moscow
 Andreas Metaxas (1786 – September 19, 1860), prime minister of Greece born on the island of Cephalonia.
 Spiridonos Louzis (c. 1741–1815), Greek scholar, diplomat, politician and naturalized ambassador of Prussia.
 Petros Melissinos Greek)(c. 1726–1797) was a General of the Army of the Russian Empire and was widely considered the best Russian artilleryman of the 18th century.

 1800 to recent past
 Giovanni Carandino, also known as Ioannis Karandinos (Greek: Ιωάννης Καραντηνός) was a Greek mathematician and translator of the major French mathematical works in the early 19th century. 
 Panayis Athanase Vagliano, Greek:  a.k.a. Panaghis Athanassiou Vallianos, (1814–1902) was a merchant and shipowner, acclaimed as the father of modern Greek shipping.
 Georgios Bonanos, sculptor (1863-1940)
 Nikolaos Xydias Typaldos (1826–1909), painter
 Photinos Panas, (January 30, 1832 – 1903) ophthalmologist, born on the Greek island of Cephalonia, Spartia. In 1860 he obtained his medical degree at Paris. He was the first professor of ophthalmology at the University of Paris, and in 1879 established the ophthalmology clinic at the Hôtel-Dieu de Paris.
 Ioannis Metaxas (April 12, 1871 – January 29, 1941), General, appointed Prime Minister of Greece between April and August 1936, and dictator during the 4th of August Regime, from 1936 until his death in 1941.
 Marinos Antypas (1872–1907), lawyer and journalist, one of the country's first socialists
 Christian Zervos (1889–1970) art collector, writer and publisher
 Mikelis Avlichos (1844–1917) Greek Anarchist

 Recent past to present
 Giorgos Kalafatis (1890–1964), founder of Panathinaikos A.O., his family descended from Dilinata of Cephalonia
 Spyridon Marinatos (1901–1974), archaeologist
 Antiochos Evangelatos (1903–1981), composer and conductor
 Dimitrios Loukatos (1908–2003), folklorist-anthropologist and specialist in Greek folklore.
 Nikolaos Platon (1909–1992), archaeologist
 Nikos Kavadias (1910–1975), poet and author
 Gerasimos D. Arsenis, (1931– ) politician, former minister of Finance, Defense and Education.
 Antonis Tritsis (1937–1992), politician, mayor of Athens
 Archie Karas (1950–), a Greek gambler known for turning a ten thousand dollar loan into million dollars before losing it all
 Gerasimos D. Danilatos, physicist and inventor of environmental scanning electron microscope
 Athanassios S. Fokas, Department of Applied Mathematics and Theoretical Physics, University of Cambridge
 Richard Wright (1943–2008) from 1984 to 1994, keyboard player with Pink Floyd
 Dionisios Vlachos (1964–present), chemical engineer, inventor and director
 Anna Pollatou (1983–2014) a rhythmic gymnast; she won a bronze medal at the 2000 Summer Olympics.
Tasia Theoharatos Katapodis (1959 - current); First generation, Greek-American banker, who graduated from Vanderbilt University as the sixth woman in its 147 year history to be Student Government President / First woman named Regional President of a U.S. based bank (Truist Bank) in Atlanta, Georgia. Her parents were born in Komitata, Erisos, Kefalonia and immigrated to the U.S. after the 1953 Great Earthquake on the island.

 Gallery 

In popular culture
Cephalonia is the home of Kassandra and Alexios, main characters of the videogame Assassin's Creed Odyssey (2018).

The 1994 novel Captain Corelli's Mandolin by Louis de Bernières, and the 2001 film adaptation of the same name, are primarily set in Cephalonia.

 See also 
 Sacred snakes of Cephalonia

 References 

 Further reading 

 Acta Archaeologica'', volume 73/2 (December 2002) is a special issue dealing with the archaeology of Kephallenia.

External links 

 Kefalonia Useful Information (PDF)
 Municipality of Elios-Pronni
 GCatholic with incumbent bio links
 International Airport of Kefalonia
 About Kefalonia

 
Islands of Greece
Islands of the Ionian Islands (region)
Regional units of the Ionian Islands (region)
Septinsular Republic
Territories of the Republic of Venice
Populated places in Cephalonia